Thailand competed at the 2013 Southeast Asian Games. The 27th Southeast Asian Games took place in Naypyidaw, the capital of Myanmar, as well as in two other main cities, Yangon and Mandalay.

Medal

Medal table

Medals by date

* Opening ceremony
** Closing ceremony

Medalists

References

Nations at the 2013 Southeast Asian Games
2013